Migas canas is a traditional preparation of fried bread and milk. It is often consumed in rural areas of Spain and is associated with people of humble origin and shepherds. It is served in a clay pot for breakfast. The dish is often prepared with milk, and bread, deep fried, and then sprinkled with sugar and cinnamon.

Features 
It is usually cooked in a kind of cauldron, where butter is fried with garlic and paprika. Then, bread and milk (preferably sheep's or goat's milk) is added.

See also

 Sop
 Sopa de gato
 Spanish cuisine

References

  El practicón : tratado completo de cocina – Ángel Muro. p. 412.

Spanish cuisine